The Qujialing culture (3400–2600 BC) was a Neolithic civilisation centered primarily on the middle Yangtze River region in Hubei and Hunan, China. The culture succeeded the Daxi culture and reached southern Shaanxi, northern Jiangxi and southwest Henan. Artefact types unique to the culture include ceramic balls and painted spindle whorls; the latter were inherited by the succeeding Shijiahe culture.

The type site at Qujialing was discovered in Jingshan  County, Hubei, China. The site was excavated from 1955 to 1957. The remains of chickens, dogs, pigs and sheep were discovered at the site. The remains of fish were discovered in ten storage pits. Egg shell pottery and tripods were also discovered at the site. City walls, man-made water systems, large courtyard buildings, and residential sites were found on the site.

Many of the artefacts from the culture are located in the Hubei Provincial Museum.

See also
 List of Neolithic cultures of China
 Chengtoushan culture
 Daxi culture
 Shijiahe culture
 Three Sovereigns and Five Emperors

References

 Allan, Sarah (ed), The Formation of Chinese Civilization: An Archaeological Perspective, 

Neolithic cultures of China
History of Hubei
4th-millennium BC establishments